An element management system (EMS) consists of systems and applications for managing network elements (NE) on the network element-management layer (NEL) of the Telecommunications Management Network (TMN) model.

As recommended by ITU-T, the element management system's key functionality is divided into five key areas - fault, configuration, accounting, performance and security (FCAPS). Portions of each of the FCAPS functionality fit into the TMN models. Northbound, the EMS interfaces to network management systems and or service management systems depending on the deployment scenario. Southbound, the EMS talks to the devices.

An element management system manages one or more of a specific type of telecommunications network element. Typically, the EMS manages the functions and capabilities within each NE but does not manage the traffic between different NEs in the network. To support management of the traffic between itself and other NEs, the EMS communicates upward to higher-level network management systems (NMS) as described in the telecommunications management network layered model. The EMS provides the foundation to implement TMN–layered operations support system (OSS) architectures that enable service providers to meet customer needs for rapid deployment of new services, as well as meeting stringent quality of service (QoS) requirements. The TeleManagement Forum common object request broker architecture (CORBA) EMS–to–NMS interface heralds a new era in OSS interoperability by making the TMN architecture a practical reality.

Examples of elements which can be managed through the EMS interfaces
 Cable telephony 
 media gateway
 Soft switch
 Video compression technology provider
 Wireless broadband provider
 Smart electricity meters

NMSs provides an integrated system for sharing device information across management applications, automation of device management tasks, visibility into the health and capability of the network, and identification and localization of network trouble. By using common centralized systems and network-inventory knowledge, an NMS delivers a unique platform of cross-functional management capabilities that reduces network administration overhead.

An EMS is a carrier class management solution. It is capable of scaling as the network grows, maintaining high performance levels as the number of network events increase, and providing simplified integration with third-party systems. It meets the service provider's expectations for integrated operational support systems.

See also
 Network engineering

References

Network management
ITU-T recommendations

.